Coopérative de l'Université Laval (often designated by its commercial diminutive "Coop Zone") is a cooperative involved in the sale of products for the community of Université Laval.

With a turnover of 50,9 million Canadian dollars and 58 442 members, it is the largest university cooperative in Quebec.

The cooperative has been recognized as number one Canadian university library by the Globe and Mail in 2007.

History 
The cooperative was founded in 1987 under the name "Procure coopérative de matériel étudiant". In 1996, the cooperative merged with its rival on campus "Coop Comptoir Sciences" to form the current entity.

Stores 

There are 4 stores:
 Maurice Pollack: cooperative general store covering all sectors
 Centre-Ville: specialized in arts
 Ferdinand-Vandry: Specialized in health sciences
 Cégep Limoilou

Community involvement
The cooperative paid $509 069 in rebate for the 2020–2021 years.

See also
 Université Laval
 Cooperative

References

External links
 Site web de la coopérative 

Université Laval
Cooperatives in Canada
Retail companies established in 1987
Retailers' cooperatives
Retail companies of Canada
Companies based in Quebec City